Bagočiai is a village in , Varėna district municipality, Alytus County, southeastern Lithuania. At the 2001 census, the village had a population of 17. At the 2011 census, the population was 12.

References

Villages in Varėna District Municipality